Long Hill may refer to:

Places

Singapore
Bukit Panjang (Long Hill), a residential town in Singapore

United Kingdom
Long Hill, a section of the A5004 road, in Derbyshire, England

United States
Long Hill, Groton, Connecticut
Long Hill, Trumbull, Connecticut
Long Hill (Wetipquin, Maryland), a house on the National Register of Historic Places
Long Hill (Beverly, Massachusetts), a historic estate
Long Hill Township, New Jersey